Sir Edward Scott (c 1578 – 1646) was an English politician who sat in the House of Commons from 1626.

Scott was the son of  Sir Thomas Scott of Scots Hall, Kent. He matriculated at Hart Hall, Oxford on 25 October 1589, aged 11. In 1625 he was Sheriff of Kent. He was appointed Knight of the Order of the Bath in 1626. In 1626, he was elected Member of Parliament for Kent. He was elected MP for Hythe in 1628 and sat until 1629 when King Charles decided to rule without parliament for eleven years.

References

1570s births
1646 deaths
Alumni of Hart Hall, Oxford
High Sheriffs of Kent
Knights of the Bath
English MPs 1626
English MPs 1628–1629